The Kinepolis Group is a Belgian-French cinema chain with 110 theaters in Europe and North America. It is Europe’s third-largest cinema chain.

History
The Kinepolis Group is a Belgian cinema chain formed in 1997 as a result of the merger of two family cinema groups, Bert and Claeys, and has been listed on the stock exchange since 1998.

The first megaplex cinema in the world is considered to be Kinepolis Brussels located near the Atomium in Brussels, Belgium, which opened in 1988 with 25 screens and 7,600 seats.

On 17 September 1998, the world's largest cinema megaplex, Kinepolis Madrid Ciudad de la Imagen, opened in Spain, with 25 screens and 9,200 seating capacity, with each seating between 211 and 996 people.

In 2006, the Claeys family withdrew from the venture, selling most of its 25% stake of shares in the company and transferring daily management to Joost Bert, who, since 2008, shares the position of CEO with Eddy Duquenne.

Competition authority
The Belgian competition authority approved the merger of the company in 1997 on the condition that the company wasn't allowed to grow within Belgium without explicit consent of the authority. This resulted in the resale of the acquired Utopolis cinemas in 2015. Kinepolis tried on several occasions to get the authority to lift the ban, and they succeeded in 2020. From August 2021 the company doesn't need permission to open new locations within Belgium.

Growth and acquisitions
Kinepolis grew significantly in recent years by opening several new locations, but also by acquiring chains and independent cinemas. Significant acquisitions were Wolff Bioscopen in 2014, Utopolis in 2015, Landmark Cinemas in 2017 and MJR Digital Cinemas in 2019.

In 2011 the company also acquired Brightfish, a Belgian company specialised in cinema advertising.

Core businesses 
The Kinepolis Group consists of seven core businesses; box office, in-theater sales (ITS), business-to-business (B2B), film distribution, screen advertising, real estate, and digital cinema services.

References 

Culture in Brussels
Cinemas in Belgium
Cinemas and movie theaters chains
Belgian brands
Entertainment companies established in 1997
1997 establishments in Belgium
Companies based in East Flanders
Ghent
Companies listed on Euronext Brussels